Ramazan Nuristani (born 1932) was an Afghan field hockey player who competed at the 1956 Summer Olympic Games. He played in two matches.

References

External links
 

Field hockey players at the 1956 Summer Olympics
Olympic field hockey players of Afghanistan
Afghan male field hockey players
Possibly living people
1932 births